Nuwan (Sinhala: නුවන්) is a Sinhalese masculine given name. It may refer to the following notable Sri Lankan cricketers: 
Nuwan Chamara (born 1983)
Nuwan Ekanayake (born 1980)
Nuwan Indika (born 1985)
Nuwan Jayawardene (born 1978)
Nuwan Karunaratne (born 1994)
Nuwan Kavinda (born 1992)
Nuwan Kulasekara (born 1982)
Nuwan Liyanapathirana (born 1987)
Nuwan Pradeep (born 1986)
Nuwan Priyadarshana (born 1993) 
Nuwan Priyankara (born 1976)
Nuwan Sameera (born 1985)
Nuwan Sampath (born 1996)
Nuwan Sanjeewa (born 1978)
Nuwan Thushara (born 1994) 
Nuwan Zoysa (born  1978)

Sinhalese masculine given names